Raymond John Allen (15 March 1940 – 2 October 2022) was a British television screenwriter and playwright.  He was best known for creating the 1970s BBC sitcom Some Mothers Do 'Ave 'Em.  He wrote comedy sketches for entertainers Frankie Howerd and Dave Allen and later Max Wall, Little and Large and Hale and Pace.

Early life
Allen was born in Ryde on the Isle of Wight on 15 March 1940.  His father, Les Allen, worked as a railway supervisor; his mother was Ivy (Ayley).  Allen attended Ryde Secondary Modern School in his hometown until he was sixteen. He started out as a cub reporter for newspaper the Isle of Wight Times, but quit after 18 months due to the unsocial hours he had to work at.  He then served in the Royal Air Force, working at its accounts office in Gloucestershire for three years.  He then returned to the island, taking jobs washing dishes in hotels and cleaning at Shanklin's Regal Cinema.

Career
Allen deciding to become a playwright, wrote around 30 serious plays however these where commercially unsuccessful for more than a decade. 

The script for his first sitcom was rejected by ITV, but his second script, conceived under the working title Have A Break, Take A Husband would be accepted by the BBC, and revolve around a couple Frank and Betty Spencer taking a honeymoon at a hotel, however BBC producer and director Michael Mills, thought the story should be better reserved for later, which would become episode 4, with the first episode instead would feature Frank Spencer becoming a sales rep, the series would evolve into which would become Some Mothers Do 'Ave 'Em, and with the casting of Michael Crawford in the title role he would create numerous of the characters traits himself. Allen was subsequently invited to write six further episodes, with two more series coming afterwards.  

Allen followed this up with The Dobson Doughnut (1974) but only the pilot episode was broadcast.  Two other sitcom proposals – Don't Move Now (1976) and You're a Genius (1977) – were produced but were not broadcast.

Allen subsequently contributed to nine editions of The Little and Large Show and sold some one-off plays.  He also wrote for All Cricket and Wellies (1986), as well as the children's show Fast Forward in 1987. However, he was unable to repeat his early success.  He did have more positive results on the stage with One of Our Howls Is Missing, which toured in 1979.

Later life and death
In 2016, Allen contributed some of the dialogue to a special one-off episode of Some Mothers' Do 'Ave 'Em for charity Sport Relief in association with BBC Sport.  He married Nancy Williams the following year.  She had one son from a previous relationship.  They resided in Ryde during his later years.  Some Mothers Do 'Ave 'Em was adapted for the stage by Guy Unsworth and started touring in 2018.

Allen died on 2 October 2022, on the Isle of Wight.  He was 82, and had suffered from cancer.

Writing credits

References

1940 births
2022 deaths
20th-century Royal Air Force personnel
British television writers
People from Ryde
Royal Air Force airmen
20th-century English dramatists and playwrights
English male dramatists and playwrights